Polygala filicaulis is a species of plant in the family Polygalaceae. It is endemic to costal swamps with altitudes below  in Madagascar.

References

filicaulis
Endemic flora of Madagascar
Taxa named by Henri Ernest Baillon